The 2009–10 curling season began in September 2009 and ended in April 2010.

Season of Champions
(Only team's skip listed)

Other events

World Curling Tour events

Women's World Curling Tour events

WCT Order of Merit Rankings (Men's)

WCT Order of Merit Rankings (Women's)

Money Ranking

2009-10
2009-10
Seasons in curling